IMx is the self-titled sixth album by American band IMx. It was released by TUG Entertainment and New Line Records on August 21, 2001. The album was the group's first album not to be released under the former label, MCA Records. Chiefly produced by Chris Stokes, IMx peaked at number 126 on the US Billboard 200, also reaching number 26 on the Top R&B/Hip-Hop Albums and number 2 on the Independent Albums. The song "Ain't No Need" was briefly used as a promotional gimmick for the 2002 comedy film The Adventures of Pluto Nash.

Track listing

Charts

References

2001 albums
IMx albums